Hermann, Prince of Wied (22 May 18145 March 1864) was a German nobleman, elder son of Johann August Karl, Prince of Wied. He was the father of Queen Elisabeth of Romania and grandfather of William, Prince of Albania.

Early life
Hermann was the second child and first son of Johann August Karl, Prince of Wied (1779–1836), son of Friedrich Karl, Prince of Wied and Countess Marie of Sayn-Wittgenstein-Berleburg, and his wife, Princess Sophie Auguste of Solms-Braunfels (1796–1855), daughter of William, Prince of Solms-Braunfels and his wife Countess Auguste of Salm-Grumbach.

Texas

In 1842, along with 20 other representatives of the German nobility, Prince Hermann founded the "''Adelsverein, Society for the Protection of German Immigrants in Texas".

The settlement of New Wied, Texas, a few miles north of New Braunfels on the Guadalupe River located on the eastern side of Comal County, was established after more than 300 German settlers in the New Braunfels region died in the epidemic of 1846. The society also established the village of Wied, Texas in Lavaca County.

Hermann purchased a share in the society after he became engaged to the sister of Wilhelm, Duke of Nassau, the protector of the society. He took no active part in the society until 1847, when it became apparent that because of debts and dissension, a new, more businesslike approach had to be taken in order to save the reputations and investments of the noblemen.  Starting in 1847, Hermann's director of business affairs, August von Bibra became actively involved in the affairs of the Verein; and, when the prince was elected president of the society in 1851 following Carl, 3rd Prince of Leiningen, Bibra took over complete management of the enterprise. Bibra struggled for more than ten years to repay the Verein debts and to revitalize the emigration program.

Marriage
Hermann married on 20 June 1842 in Biebrich, Princess Marie of Nassau (1825–1902), daughter of William, Duke of Nassau and his first wife Princess Louise of Saxe-Hildburghausen.

They had three children:
Princess Elisabeth of Wied (29 December 1843 – 3 March 1916) married Carol I of Romania, had issue.
William, Prince of Wied (22 August 1845 – 22 October 1907) married Princess Marie of the Netherlands, had issue.
Prince Otto of Wied (22 November 1850 – 18 February 1862)

Ancestry

Notes and sources
Neue Deutsche Biografie (NDB), Band 3, Seite 149
The Royal House of Stuart, London, 1969, 1971, 1976, Addington, A. C., Reference: 336

1814 births
1864 deaths
Members of the Prussian House of Lords
People from Neuwied
People from New Braunfels, Texas
House of Wied-Neuwied